Capperia marginellus is a moth of the family Pterophoridae. It is found on Sicily, Cyprus and Turkey.

The wingspan is about 14 mm.

References

External links
lepiforum.de

Oxyptilini
Moths described in 1847
Moths of Asia
Plume moths of Europe
Taxa named by Philipp Christoph Zeller